Mark Witte (born December 3, 1959) is a former American football tight end. He played for the Tampa Bay Buccaneers from 1983 to 1985 and for the Detroit Lions in 1987.

References

1959 births
Living people
American football tight ends
North Texas Mean Green football players
Tampa Bay Buccaneers players
Detroit Lions players
National Football League replacement players